In architecture, the frieze  is the wide central section part of an entablature and may be plain in the Ionic or Doric order, or decorated with bas-reliefs. Paterae are also usually used to decorate friezes. Even when neither columns nor pilasters are expressed, on an astylar wall it lies upon the architrave ("main beam") and is capped by the moldings of the cornice. A frieze can be found on many Greek and Roman buildings, the Parthenon Frieze being the most famous, and perhaps the most elaborate. This style is typical for the Persians.

In interiors, the frieze of a room is the section of wall above the picture rail and under the crown moldings or cornice. By extension, a frieze is a long stretch of painted, sculpted or even calligraphic decoration in such a position, normally above eye-level. Frieze decorations may depict scenes in a sequence of discrete panels.  The material of which the frieze is made of may be plasterwork, carved wood or other decorative medium.

In an example of an architectural frieze on the façade of a building, the octagonal Tower of the Winds in the Roman agora at Athens bears relief sculptures of the eight winds on its frieze.

A pulvinated frieze (or pulvino) is convex in section. Such friezes were features of 17th-century Northern Mannerism, especially in subsidiary friezes, and much employed in interior architecture and in furniture.

The concept of a frieze has been generalized in the mathematical construction of frieze patterns.

Achaemenid friezes

Greek friezes

Indian friezes

References

External links

 

 
Columns and entablature